List of SpaceX launches may refer to:

 List of Falcon 1 launches, SpaceX's first launch vehicle
 List of Falcon 9 and Falcon Heavy launches, SpaceX's second and third launch vehicles

See also 
 List of SpaceX Starship flight tests